Services Institute of Medical Sciences (Urdu:), established in 2003, is a public medical school located in Lahore. Services Hospital and Punjab Institute of Mental Health are the affiliated teaching hospitals. It is officially abbreviated as SIMS.

The college admits students on open merit and is granted through a centralized Medical College Admission Test conducted annually by the Pakistan Medical Commission.

History
Faisal Masud was the founding principal of the institution. In its initial days, the college was located in a portion of the building of Institute of Public Health at Birdwood Road, Lahore. This institution is now housed in its new campus adjacent to the Punjab Institute of Cardiology.

Campus

The college has five main lecture theatres in addition to the demonstration rooms. Its library has more than 8000 books and subscribes to 78 national and international journals available as paperbacks. In addition, it gives access to Higher Education Commission of Pakistan-funded electronic access to thousands of scientific books and journals. Services Hospital is a 1596-bedded teaching hospital affiliated with the institution along with Punjab Institute of Mental Health.

Departments
Its basic departments are equipped with computer aided laboratories, Carl-Zeiss microscopes for the students and penta-head and deca-head microscopes for demonstration and research.The Department of Pathology is ISO 9002 and ISO 15142 certified.

Basic science departments
Anatomy
Biochemistry
Community medicine
Forensic medicine
Pathology
Pharmacology
Physiology

Medicine and allied departments
Cardiology
Dermatology
Endocrinology & Metabolism
General medicine
Neurology
Pediatrics
Preventive medicine
Psychiatry
Pulmonology (Chest medicine)
Radiotherapy
Urology

Surgery and allied departments
Anesthesiology
Cardiac surgery
Cosmetic surgery
General surgery
Neurosurgery
Obstetrics and gynaecology
Ophthalmology
Oral and maxillofacial surgery
Orthopedics
Otorhinolaryngology
Pediatric surgery
Radiology

Administrative departments
Esculapio Creative Department
IT Department
Medical Education Department

Official publication
Esculapio Creative Department is an administrative department of the Services Institute of Medical Sciences responsible for publications. It is situated in Medical Unit-IV of Services Hospital. The SIMS journal is The Esculapio.

Recognition and affiliations
The college is recognized and affiliated with the following:
College of Physicians and Surgeons Pakistan
Pakistan Medical and Dental Council
iMed - FAIMER
Affiliated with University of Health Sciences, Lahore

Gallery

See also
List of medical schools in Pakistan

References

External links

ESCULAPIO

 
Medical colleges in Punjab, Pakistan
Universities and colleges in Lahore
Academic institutions in Pakistan
Educational institutions established in 2003
Postgraduate schools in Pakistan
2003 establishments in Pakistan